This year's Philippine contingent at the 26th Southeast Asian Games consists of 512 athletes and 140 officials which is higher than the proposed contingent. Filipino Athletes will compete in a total of 39 sports events. The games will be held from 11 to 22 November 2011 in Jakarta and Palembang, Indonesia.

Medalists

Gold

Silver

Bronze

Medal summary

By sports
According to Philippine Sports Commission Chairman Ritchie Garcia, he expects the country to haul at least 70 Gold Medals. He mentioned boxing, taekwondo, billiards, basketball, softball, baseball, wushu, swimming and athletics as the sports that will harvest sure gold medals in the SEA Games.

By date

Results

The Philippines sweeps the Softball event winning both Men's and Women's Division. Philippine Sinag Team earns their 15th overall medal in the Men's Basketball. On the second day of the competitions, Marestella Torres broke the SEA Games Record she made in the 2009 Southeast Asian Games by registering 6.71 m in the Women's Long Jump.

This is the first time since 2001 wherein Filipino Tankers did not deliver any Gold Medals primarily due to the retirement of Olympian Miguel Molina and absence of other veteran Tankers.

For the second time in the history of the Southeast Asian Games, the Philippines placed in one of its lowest, ranking 6th, with 36 gold medals. The same thing happened in 2007 when the country placed 6th with 41 gold medals.

References

Nations at the 2011 Southeast Asian Games
2011 in Philippine sport
2011